The Last Race (Italian: L'ultima gara) is a 1954 Italian drama film directed by Piero Costa and starring Vera Bergman, Enzo Fiermonte and Checco Durante. Production began in 1949, but was not completed until 1953 with the film given its release the following year. It earned just under 30 million lire at the box office.

Synopsis
Two rowers are both in love with the same woman while training for a race on the River Tiber.

Cast
 Vera Bergman as Sandra
 Enzo Fiermonte as Filippo
 Checco Durante as Sor Giggi
 Franco Silva as Marco
 Franco Pesce as Piuma
 Dante Serra as Carlo
 Anna Maria Dionisi as  Severina
 Margherita Bossi as Madre di Severina
 Arturo Dominici Doctor Magni
 Mario Lodolini as Cristofari
 Irene Quattrini as Nurse
 Felice Romano as Padron Giulio

References

Bibliography 
 Chiti, Roberto & Poppi, Roberto. Dizionario del cinema italiano: Dal 1945 al 1959. Gremese Editore, 1991.

External links 
 

1954 films
Italian drama films
1954 drama films
1950s Italian-language films
Films directed by Piero Costa
Films set in Rome
1950s Italian films